Malmesbury railway station served the town of Malmesbury in Wiltshire, England.

Background

Work started on 1 July 1865, but due to disagreements between the two major shareholders, the Midland Railway and the Great Western, work was stalled, and in 1871 the company was wound up.

Operations
Unusually, the station was accessed by a short tunnel, and beyond the town, perhaps with the original scheme development to Stroud in mind. After the Severn Tunnel was constructed to directly connect to South Wales, its line crossed the Malmesbury branch. In 1933, connection was made with this line, and the additional line truncated.

On 10 September 1951 the line closed to passenger traffic, and to goods 10 years later on 11 November 1962, after which the tracks were lifted.
The station site today is an industrial estate development, in part tenanted by Hilditch.

References

External links
 Aerial view of Malmesbury station, 1934 - from the Historic England "Britain from Above" archive

Railway station
Disused railway stations in Wiltshire
Former Great Western Railway stations
Railway stations in Great Britain opened in 1877
Railway stations in Great Britain closed in 1962